Ephrata may refer to:

Places
Ephrata, Suriname
Ephrata, Pennsylvania, U.S.
Ephrata, Washington, U.S.
Ephrata Township, Pennsylvania, U.S.

Other uses
Ephrata Cloister, a religious community in Ephrata, Pennsylvania

See also

Efrata or Efrat, an Israeli settlement in the West Bank
Ephratah, New York
Ephrath